Robert Grissold (died 1604) was an accomplice of John Sugar, the Roman Catholic priest co-martyred at Warwick in 1604. His name is also given as Greswold or Griswold. He is a Catholic martyr, beatified in 1987 by Pope John Paul II.

References

External links
Gillow biography
Bede Camm, Forgotten Shrines

Year of birth missing
1604 deaths
English beatified people
16th-century births
16th-century Roman Catholics
17th-century Roman Catholics
17th-century Roman Catholic martyrs
Eighty-five martyrs of England and Wales
16th-century English people
17th-century English people